This is a list of Richard Marx's session work playing various instruments and singing backing vocals for various artists.

1980s

1982
Lionel Richie - Lionel Richie
 "You Are" (backing vocals)

1983
Lionel Richie - Can't Slow Down
 "All Night Long" (backing vocals)
 "Running with the Night" (backing vocals)

1984
George Benson - 20/20
 "Nothing's Gonna Change My Love for You" (backing vocals)

Chicago - Chicago 17
 "We Can Stop the Hurting" (backing vocals)

Julio Iglesias - 1100 Bel Air Place
 "Moonlight Lady" (backing vocals)

Fee Waybill - Read My Lips
 "Who Loves You Baby" (backing vocals)

Peabo Bryson - Straight from the Heart 
 If Ever You're in My Arms Again (backing vocals)
 Learning the Ways of Love (backing vocals)

1985
Whitney Houston - Whitney Houston
 "Saving All My Love for You" (backing vocals, guitars)
 "All at Once" (backing vocals, guitars)
 "The Greatest Love of All" (backing vocals, guitars)
"Hold Me" (backing vocals, guitars)

1986
Madonna - True Blue
 "White Heat" (backing vocals)

1987
Barbra Streisand - One Voice
 "Somewhere" (backing vocals)
 "Evergreen" (backing vocals)
 "Something's Coming" (backing vocals)
 "People" (backing vocals)
 "Send In the Clowns" (backing vocals)
 "Over the Rainbow" (backing vocals)
 "Guilty" (backing vocals)
 "What Kind of Fool" (backing vocals)
 "Papa, Can You Hear Me?" (backing vocals)
 "The Way We Were" (backing vocals)
 "It's a New World" (backing vocals)
 "Happy Days Are Here Again" (backing vocals)
 "America the Beautiful" (backing vocals)

1988
Vixen - Vixen
 "Edge of a Broken Heart" (keyboards)

1989
Michael Bolton - Soul Provider
 "Soul Provider" (backing vocals)

Billy Joel - Storm Front
 "That's Not Her Style" (backing vocals)
 "Storm Front" (backing vocals)

1990s

1990
Tim Feehan - Full Contact
 "Heart in Pieces" (backing vocals)

1993
John Farnham - Then Again
 "The Reason Why" (piano)

1995
Michael Bolton - Greatest Hits (1985–1995)
 "Soul Provider" (backing vocals)

Amy Sky - Cool Rain
 "Til Tomorrow" (backing vocals)

1997
Fee Waybill - Don't Be Scared By These Hands
 "I Know You" (backing vocals)
 "Tall Dark and Harmless" (backing vocals)
 "Shut Up and Love Me" (backing vocals)
 "The Swing of Things" (backing vocals)
 "Fools Cry" (backing vocals)
 "Surprise Yourself" (backing vocals)
 "I've Seen This Movie Before" (backing vocals)
 "What's Wrong with That" (backing vocals)
 "Somewhere Deep Inside" (keyboards)

1998
Sarah Brightman - Eden
The Last Words You Said (backing vocals)

1999
Barbra Streisand - A Love Like Ours
 "If You Ever Leave Me" (Duet with Vince Gill) (keyboards)

2000s

2000
Natalie Cole - Greatest Hits-Volume 1
 "Angel on My Shoulder" (backing vocals)

Barry Mann - Soul and Inspiration
"Rock and Roll Lullaby" (backing vocals)

Kenny Rogers - There You Go Again
 "Crazy Me" (backing vocals)
 "I Do It for Your Love" (backing vocals, keyboards)

2001
Natalie Cole - Love Songs
 "Angel on My Shoulder" (backing vocals)

Josh Groban - Josh Groban
 "To Where You Are" (keyboards, piano)

2002
Michael Bolton - Only a Woman Like You
 "Slowly" (backing vocals)
 "I Surrender" (backing vocals, keyboards)
 "Eternally" (backing vocals, keyboards)

Chris Botti - December
 "Have Yourself a Merry Little Christmas" (backing vocals)

Marie Sisters - Marie Sisters
 "I Will Hold On" (strings)
 "If I Fall in Love Tonight" (backing vocals)

Olivia Newton-John - 2
 "Never Far Away" (Duet with Richard Marx) (keyboards)

Barbra Streisand - Duets
 "If You Ever Leave Me" (Duet with Vince Gill) (keyboards)

2003
Chicago - The Box
 "We Can Stop the Hurting" (backing vocals)

Billy Ray Cyrus - The Other Side
 "Tip of My Heart" (backing vocals)

Kenny Loggins - It's About Time
 "With This Ring" (backing vocals, keyboards)
 "I Miss Us" (backing vocals, keyboards)
 "The One That Got Away" (acoustic piano)

Kristy Starling - Kristy Starling
To Where You Are (keyboards)

Luther Vandross - Dance with My Father
 "Dance with My Father" (keyboard and drum programming)

2004
Sissel - My Heart
Someone Like You (all instruments)
Beyond Imagination (backing vocals, keyboards, drum programming)

2005
Disney's Happiest Celebration on Earth: 50 Years
LeAnn Rimes - "Remember When" (piano, keyboards, backing vocals)

2006
Sister Hazel - Absolutely
"Meet Me in the Memory" (keyboards))

Luther Vandross - The Ultimate Luther Vandross
"Dance with My Father" (keyboards and drum programming)

2007
Kenny Loggins - How About Now
"I'll Remember Your Name" (backing vocals, acoustic guitar)

New Music from an Old Friend
Kenny Loggins - "I'll Remember Your Name" (backing vocals, acoustic guitar)

2008
George Canyon - What I Do
"Just Like You" (backing vocals)
"Pretty Drunk Out Tonight" (backing vocals)
"All or Nothing" (backing vocals)
"Let It Out" (backing vocals)
"In Your Arms Again" (arranger, piano, strings)
"Back to Life" (backing vocals)
"Betty's Buns" (backing vocals)
"If I Was Jesus" (backing vocals)
"What I Do" (arranger, strings)
"Last Man" (backing vocals)
"I Believe in Angels" (backing vocals)

2009
Katherine Jenkins - Believe
"Fear of Falling" (backing vocals)
Red - Innocence & Instinct
"Out from Under" (backing vocals)
Vertical Horizon - Burning the Days
"Here" (piano)

2010s

2010
Ringo Starr - Y Not
"Mystery of the Night" (backing vocals)
Rhonda Vincent - Taken
"Taken" (backing vocals)

2013

Heart
All Through the Night (backing vocals)
Vertical Horizon - Echoes from the Underground
"You Never Let Me Down" (piano, backing vocals)
"Evermore" (backing vocals)
"Song for Someone" (backing vocals)
"Consolation" (backing vocals)

2014
Heart - Home for the Holidays
All Through the Night - (vocals)

2015

Ringo Starr - Postcards from Paradise
"Right Side of the Road" (backing vocals)
"Not Looking Back" (guitars, backing vocals)

2018

Vertical Horizon - The Lost Mile
"I'm Not Running" (backing vocals)

2019

Matt Nathanson - Postcards (from Chicago)
"Surrender" (Duet with Richard Marx)

2020s

2020

Fee Waybill - Rides Again
"Faker" (background vocals)
"How Dare You" (guitar, bass, keyboards, background vocals)
"Don't Want to Pull the Trigger" (background vocals)
"Say Goodbye" (acoustic guitar, keyboards, background vocals)
"Promise Land" (guitar, bass, keyboards, background vocals)
"Man Of the World" (guitar, keyboards, background vocals)
"Still You on the Inside" (guitar, keyboards, background vocals)
"Woulda Coulda Shoulda" (bass, keyboards, background vocals)
"Meant To Be Alone" (background vocals)

Discography
Marx, Richard
Discographies of American artists